The HgcG RNA gene is a non-coding RNA that was identified computationally and experimentally verified in AT-rich hyperthermophiles. The genes from this screen were named hgcA through hgcG ("high GC"). HgcG is of unknown function. hgcG is significantly similar to a region of the Archaeoglobus fulgidus genome. The genes were named hgcA through hgcG ("high GC"). It was later identified as Pab40 H/ACA snoRNA with rRNA targets.

See also 
 HgcC family RNA
 HgcE RNA
 HgcF RNA

References

External links 
 

Non-coding RNA